Monsbey College is a private vocational college offering over 15+ programs, including Certified Nursing Assistant, Home Health Aide, Pharmacy Technician, Medical Assistant, and Medical terminology . Its main campus is located in Watsonville, California.   The college opened in 2008. As is true with most vocational colleges, the a majority of its students attend part-time. A main attraction to the college is the low cost and efficient training under those with years of experience. The college had its programs approved by: California Dept. of Public Health (CDPH, American Red Cross, Pharmacy Technician Certification Board (PTCB), National Healthcareer Association (NHA)and Work Force Investment Board (California's Eligible Training Provider).

References

External links
 Register-Pajaronian News Article
 CNA Program

Universities and colleges in Santa Cruz County, California
Watsonville, California
2008 establishments in California